Yerxa may refer to:

 Cabot Abram Yerxa (1883-1965), builder of Cabot's Pueblo Museum in Desert Hot Springs, California
 Donald A. Yerxa (born 1950), author co-director of The Historical Society at Boston University
 John Yerxa (1904–1967), an American politician
 Leo Yerxa, a Canadian visual artist and writer
 Michael Yerxa, a Canadian documentary filmmaker
 Ron Yerxa (born 1947), American film producer
 Rufus Yerxa (born 1951), Deputy Director-General of the World Trade Organization